The Power of Government Act or Lex Tulenheimo was a bill proposed by the Tokoi Cabinet in the spring of 1917 to the Finnish Parliament, whose purpose was to remove a significant part of the power of the Grand Duke of Finland and invest it in the Finnish Senate after the February Revolution.

External links

1917 in Finland
Law of Finland
Grand Duchy of Finland